Cape Irwyn is a rock cape at the edge of the Ross Ice Shelf forming the northern extremity of the Lillie Range in the foothills of the Prince Olav Mountains of Antarctica. It was named by the southern party of the New Zealand Geological Survey Antarctic Expedition (1963–64) for Irwyn Smith, a relief radio operator at Scott Base, 1963–64.

References

Headlands of Antarctica
Dufek Coast